Robert Taylor Homes was a public housing project in the Bronzeville neighborhood on the South Side of Chicago, Illinois from 1962 to 2007. The largest housing project in the United States, it consisted of 28 virtually identical high-rises, set out in a linear plan for two miles (3 km), with the high-rises regularly configured in a horseshoe shape of three in each block.  It was located along State Street between Pershing Road (39th Street) and 54th Street, east of the Dan Ryan Expressway. The project was named for Robert Rochon Taylor (1899–1957), an African-American activist and the first African American chairman of the Chicago Housing Authority (CHA). It was a part of the State Street Corridor which included other CHA housing projects: Stateway Gardens, Dearborn Homes, Harold Ickes Homes, and Hilliard Homes.

History
Robert Taylor Homes were completed in 1962 and named for Robert Rochon Taylor (1899–1957), an African American activist and Chicago Housing Authority (CHA) board member who in 1950 resigned when the city council refused to endorse potential building locations throughout the city of Chicago that would induce racially integrated housing.
At one time, it was the largest public housing development in the country, and it was intended to offer decent affordable housing.  It was composed of 28 high-rise buildings with 16 stories each, with a total of 4,415 units, mostly arranged in U-shaped clusters of three, stretching for two miles (three kilometers).

Problems
The Robert Taylor Homes faced many of the same problems that doomed other high-rise housing projects in Chicago such as Cabrini–Green.  These problems included drug dealing, drug abuse, gang violence, and the perpetuation of poverty. Planned for 11,000 inhabitants, the Robert Taylor Homes housed up to a peak of 27,000 people. Six of the poorest US census areas with populations above 2,500 were found there. Including children who are not of working age, at one point 95 percent of the housing development's 27,000 residents were unemployed and listed public assistance as their only income source, and 40 percent of the households were single-parent, female-headed households earning less than $5,000 per year. About 96 percent were African-American. The concrete high-rises, many with the scars of arson fire, sat in a narrow  stretch of slum. Neglect was evident in littered streets, poorly enforced building codes and scant commercial or civic amenities. Aside from neglect and ignoring crime, police officers also felt unsafe in darkened hallways and were frequently shot at from the high rises. In the Robert Taylor Homes a survey was conducted and showed that the majority of residents either had a family member in prison or expected one to return from prison within two years. This caused issues when residents tried to relocate; many of these returning prisoners had partners, children and/or mental illnesses that prevented them from relocating to another residence.

Gang violence and drugs
The Mickey Cobras (MC's), Gangster Disciples (GDs), and Black Disciples (BDs) gangs dominated the housing project. Police intelligence sources say that the elevated number of homicides was the result of gang "turf wars", as gang members and drug dealers fought over control of given Chicago neighborhoods. The CHA estimated that $45,000 in drug deals took place daily. Former residents of the Robert Taylor Homes have said that the drug dealers fought for control of the buildings. In one weekend, more than 300 separate shooting incidents were reported in the vicinity of the Robert Taylor Homes. Twenty-eight people were killed during the same weekend, with 26 of the 28 incidents believed to be gang-related.

Crime
Numerous crimes occurred in the Robert Taylor Homes, reaching an all–time high in the mid–1970s. Most crimes committed at the housing project were drug and street gang violence related. In October 1976, 22–year-old Denise Dozier was thrown from a 15th floor apartment window; she survived the incident. On June 25, 1983, 18 month-old Vinyette Teague was abducted from the project after her grandmother left her alone in the hallway for a few minutes to answer a phone call. An estimated 50 people were in the hallway at the time of the abduction, but police were unable to gather enough evidence to make any arrests. She has never been seen or heard from since. On August 15, 1991, shortly before midnight, CHA police officer Jimmie Haynes was fatally wounded by a sniper rifle at the project. He died two days later at Mercy Hospital and Medical Center. Three suspects were charged with his murder. A maintenance worker at the project was beaten to death by gang members after he allowed police officers access to a building where a gang meeting was taking place in February 1993.

Redevelopment
In 1993, it was decided to replace all Robert Taylor Homes with a mixed-income community in low-rise buildings as part of a federal block grant received for the purpose from the HOPE VI federal program.  In 1996, HOPE VI federal funds were granted specifically for off-site Taylor replacement housing. The Chicago Housing Authority moved out all residents by the end of 2005. On March 8, 2007, the last remaining building was  demolished. As of 2007, a total of 2,300 low-rise residential homes and apartments, seven new and renovated community facilities, and a number of retail and commercial spaces are to be built in place of the old high-rise buildings. The development costs are expected to total an estimated $583 million. Part of the redevelopment is the renaming of the area to "Legends South".

Notable residents
The Robert Taylor Homes were also home at one time to:
 Mr. T (Lawrence Tureaud), actor and former wrestler.
 Kirby Puckett, baseball player.
 Deval Patrick, 71st Governor of Massachusetts (2007-2015).
Corey Holcomb, comedian and actor.
Open Mike Eagle, Hip-hop artist.
 Ronnie Lester, University of Iowa All American, NBA Player for Chicago Bulls and Los Angeles Lakers, NBA Scout for Los Angeles Lakers and Phoenix Suns.
Beauty Turner, writer and community activist. 
Maurice Cheeks, basketball player.
Kenny Duckworth, Kendrick Lamar's father.
Michael Colyar, comedian and actor. 
Derrius Quarles, Entrepreneur and author

Research
Because of the standardized housing and near homogeneous demographics, the RTH cluster was an ideal location for studying the effects of urban living and lack of "green space" on the human condition. This type of research in environmental psychology was most clearly demonstrated by a group of studies done by Frances Kuo and William Sullivan of the Landscape and Human Health Laboratory (formerly the Human-Environment Research Laboratory) at the University of Illinois at Urbana–Champaign. The history and economy of this housing development was studied by Sudhir Alladi Venkatesh in his book American Project. In his 2008 book Gang Leader For A Day: A Rogue Sociologist Takes To The Streets, Venkatesh also profiled the area, its residents and the "Black Kings", a Chicago gang known for selling drugs. The "Black Kings" were renamed for the book to preserve anonymity, although it is likely referential to the Gangster Disciples. Although not about the Robert Taylor Homes, author Alex Kotlowitz wrote about the Chicago Housing Authority, the demographics and the history of the Chicago Housing projects in his book There Are No Children Here. The book discusses the Henry Horner Homes, but also looks at and discusses the issues within the entire area. The housing development was the subject of a PBS documentary called Crisis On Federal Street which aired nationally in August 1987.

References

External links

CHA's official Robert Taylor Homes site 
"Midst the Handguns' Red Glare - Chicago's Robert Taylor Homes, a public housing development", Summer, 1999.
Farewell to the High-rise - the last days of Chicago's Robert Taylor Homes
Robert Taylor Homes website at Emporis
Encyclopedia of Chicago entry on Robert Taylor Homes
"Dislocation", a film by Sudhir Alladi Venkatesh, Professor of Sociology and African-American Studies at Columbia University, which "chronicles the lives of tenants in one building as they move through the six-month relocation process" according to the website's description.
A history of the building's namesake Robert Taylor 
Robert Taylor Homes Bows Out photos by ChicagoEye (Lee Bey).

Public housing in Chicago
South Side, Chicago
Neighborhoods in Chicago
Residential skyscrapers in Chicago
Residential buildings completed in 1962
Buildings and structures demolished in 2007
Former buildings and structures in Chicago
Demolished buildings and structures in Chicago
Urban decay in the United States
1962 establishments in Illinois
2007 disestablishments in Illinois